An aleatory contract is a contract where an uncertain event determines the parties' rights and obligations. For example, gambling, wagering, or betting typically use aleatory contracts. Additionally, another very common type of aleatory contract is an insurance policy.

The term was a classification developed in later medieval Roman law to cover all contracts whose fulfilment depended on chance, including gambling, insurance, speculative investment and life annuities. Many modern forms of derivatives and options may in some cases also be considered aleatory contracts. For example, the French civil code contains a chapter on aleatory contracts, with specific provisions for gaming (gambling) and life annuities.

References

Contract law
Insurance law
Gambling regulation